Domenico Vantini (1765 – 22 June 1825) was an Italian painter of the Neoclassic period, mainly active in Brescia and Mantua.

Vantini was born and died in Brescia.  He was first a pupil of Santo Cattaneo; he then moved to Mantua to work with Giuseppe Bottani. He specialized in miniature portraits.

References

1825 deaths
1765 births
18th-century Italian painters
Italian male painters
19th-century Italian painters
Painters from Brescia
Neoclassical painters
Portrait miniaturists
People from Brescia
19th-century Italian male artists
Italian neoclassical painters
18th-century Italian male artists